Ivan Kostić is a Serbian politician. He served in the National Assembly of Serbia from 2016 to 2020 as a member of the right-wing Dveri party.

Early life and career
Kostić was born in Vrbas, Vojvodina, in what was then the Socialist Republic of Serbia in the Socialist Federal Republic of Yugoslavia. He graduated from the Faculty of Economics in Subotica in 1994, received an economics degree in 2002, and received a master's degree in agriculture in 2014. Kostić took part in regular military service in the Serbian Armed Forces from 2002 to 2003, has been active with several Eastern Orthodox Christian organizations, and has operated his own business since 2008.

Politician
Kostić joined Dveri in 2002 and has been its coordinator in Vojvodina since it began operating as a political party. He led Dveri's electoral list in the 2012 Vojvodina provincial election and subsequently led a combined Dveri–Democratic Party of Serbia (Demokratska stranka Srbije, DSS) list in the 2016 provincial election. In both instances, the list did not cross the electoral threshold to win representation in the provincial assembly.

He received the fourteenth position on Dveri's list for the 2012 Serbian parliamentary election and the tenth position in 2014. In addition, he appeared in the lead position on Dveri's list for the Vrbas municipal assembly in the 2013 Serbian local elections. On each occasion, the party's list failed to cross the electoral threshold. A combined Dveri–DSS list did, however, win thirteen seats in the 2016 Serbian parliamentary election, which was held concurrently with that year's provincial election. Kostić, who held the thirteenth position on the list, was elected to the national assembly. The Serbian Progressive Party and its allies won the election, and Dveri served in opposition.

Kostić was selected as chair of the parliamentary committee on the diaspora and Serbs in the region in July 2016, after being nominated by the governing Progressive Party. In this capacity, he worked with Serbian community organizations in neighbouring countries, sought to initiate a public discussion on the situation of Serbs in Bosnia and Herzegovina, and helped to organize events commemorating the Serb, Jewish, and Roma victims of the Jasenovac concentration camp in World War II. He was dismissed as committee chair in May 2018. No formal explanation was given, though Dveri members claimed that it was because of Kostić's decision to invite Russian deputy Natalia Poklonskaya, from the disputed territory of Crimea, to the Serbian assembly.

During his term in parliament, Kostić was also a member of the committee on the economy, regional development, trade, tourism, and energy; a deputy member of the defence and internal affairs committee and the committee on agriculture, forestry, and water management; a member of Serbia's delegation to the Parliamentary Assembly of the Black Sea Economic Cooperation; and a member of the parliamentary friendship groups with Argentina, Greece, Israel, Montenegro, Romania, and Russia.

Dveri joined an opposition boycott of the assembly in 2019 and did not participate in the 2020 parliamentary elections. In early 2020, Kostić joined Dveri leader Boško Obradović in an eleven-day hunger strike on the steps of the national assembly, accusing the Progressives and their allies of undermining Serbia's state institutions. His assembly mandate ended on 3 August 2020.

References

1975 births
Living people
People from Vrbas, Serbia
Members of the National Assembly (Serbia)
Members of the Parliamentary Assembly of the Black Sea Economic Cooperation
Dveri politicians